Zodarion bacelarae is a spider species found in Portugal.

See also
 List of Zodariidae species

References

External links

bacelarae
Spiders described in 2003
Spiders of Europe
Fauna of Portugal